Abdullah Qazi (born 25 March 1995), is a Pakistani professional footballer who plays as a defender for La Máquina.

International career
Qazi earned his first national team call up in July 2018. He received another call up ahead of the 2018 SAFF Championship in Bangladesh. He was called up once more in December.

Career statistics

International

References

1995 births
Living people
Pakistani footballers
Pakistani expatriate footballers
Pakistan international footballers
Association football defenders
Expatriate soccer players in the United States
Pakistani expatriate sportspeople in the United States